Boatman is a locality in the Shire of Murweh, Queensland, Australia.

History 
The locality was named and bounded on 28 March 2002.

Road infrastructure
The Warrego Highway passes to the north, the Mitchell Highway to the west, and the Balonne Highway to the south.

References 

Shire of Murweh
Localities in Queensland